Yang Cuiping (born 4 October 1981) is a Chinese rower. She competed in the women's eight event at the 2004 Summer Olympics.

References

1981 births
Living people
Chinese female rowers
Olympic rowers of China
Rowers at the 2004 Summer Olympics
People from Yulin, Shaanxi
Asian Games medalists in rowing
Rowers at the 2002 Asian Games
Asian Games gold medalists for China
Medalists at the 2002 Asian Games
20th-century Chinese women
21st-century Chinese women